Ust-Berezovka is a rural locality (a settlement) and the administrative center of Ust-Berezovskoye Rural Settlement, Yurlinsky District, Perm Krai, Russia. The population was 551 as of 2010. There are 16 streets.

Geography 
Ust-Berezovka is located 59 km northwest of Yurla (the district's administrative centre) by road. Lipova is the nearest rural locality.

References 

Rural localities in Yurlinsky District